Cheyenne Valley is an unincorporated community in Putnam County, West Virginia, United States.

References 

Unincorporated communities in West Virginia
Unincorporated communities in Putnam County, West Virginia